Xu Liangying (3 May 1920 – 28 January 2013) was a Chinese physicist, translator and a historian and philosopher of natural science.

Biography
Xu was born in Linhai of Taizhou, Zhejiang on May 3 of 1920. Xu graduated from the Department of Physics of Zhejiang University in 1942. Xu was a student of Shu Xingbei and Wang Ganchang.

Xu was an editor of Chinese Science Bulletin, a major Chinese science journal. Xu was treated unfairly during Mao Zedong's Anti-Rightist Campaign which started in 1957, and he was sent back to his hometown to undergo "reform through labour" (laogai). After the end of the Cultural Revolution, Xu was politically rehabilitated and returned to work in Beijing.

Xu was a longtime researcher at the Institute for the History of Natural Science, Chinese Academy of Sciences.

Work
Xu's main interests were in the history of science, the philosophy of science (especially of physics), and the relations between science and human society. Xu's The Collected Works of Albert Einstein currently is the most comprehensive Chinese translational version of Albert Einstein's work.

Award
Xu received the second Andrei Sakharov Prize, from the American Physical Society (APS) in 2008.

References

External links
 2008 Andrei Sakharov Prize Recipient: Liangying Xu (Chinese Academy of Sciences)
 The New York Times: Einstein’s Man in Beijing: A Rebel With a Cause
 APS: APS Honors Chinese Scientist and Human Rights Activist
 China Digital Times: Einstein’s Man in Beijing: A Rebel With a Cause – Dennis Overbye

1920 births
2013 deaths
Zhejiang University alumni
Physicists from Zhejiang
People's Republic of China historians
Philosophers of science
Writers from Taizhou, Zhejiang
People's Republic of China science writers
People's Republic of China translators
People's Republic of China philosophers
Scientists from Taizhou, Zhejiang
Philosophers from Zhejiang
20th-century Chinese translators
21st-century Chinese translators
Historians from Zhejiang
Victims of the Anti-Rightist Campaign